Kyle Michael Shanahan (born December 14, 1979) is an American football coach who is the head coach for the San Francisco 49ers of the National Football League (NFL). He came to prominence as the offensive coordinator for the Atlanta Falcons, whose offense in 2016 led the league in points scored and helped the team reach Super Bowl LI. Shanahan became the head coach of the 49ers the following season, whom he has led to three playoff runs, two division titles, three NFC Championship Games, and a Super Bowl appearance in Super Bowl LIV.

Early life
Shanahan was born in Minneapolis, Minnesota, while his father Mike Shanahan coached at the University of Minnesota. He attended Saratoga High School in Saratoga, California in 1994, while his father worked as offensive coordinator for the San Francisco 49ers.  He later attended Cherry Creek High School in Greenwood Village, Colorado, while his father served as head coach of the Denver Broncos. Shanahan accepted a scholarship offer by Carl Franks of Duke University, but chose to transfer as redshirt freshman to the University of Texas at Austin. Shanahan played wide receiver on a Longhorn team that featured future college coach Major Applewhite as well as future NFL players Roy Williams, Cedric Benson, Bo Scaife, Mike Williams, Quentin Jammer, and Chris Simms. Shanahan caught 14 passes for 127 yards in his career for the University of Texas at Austin.

Coaching career

College career

Soon after he graduated from Texas in 2003, Shanahan became graduate assistant to Karl Dorrell at UCLA.

Tampa Bay Buccaneers
Shanahan was hired as assistant coach for offensive quality control under head coach Jon Gruden with the Tampa Bay Buccaneers.

Houston Texans
In 2006, Shanahan was hired by Gary Kubiak to serve as wide receivers coach for the Houston Texans. Kubiak had previously served as offensive coordinator under Mike Shanahan with the Broncos. At the time, Kyle Shanahan was the youngest position coach in the NFL. A season later, Shanahan received another promotion to become the Texans quarterback coach. In 2007, he had also been offered to become offensive coordinator at the University of Minnesota, where former Broncos assistant Tim Brewster just became head coach. Shanahan declined, citing his decision to be an NFL coach. Shanahan was immediately dealt as the frontrunner for the vacant offensive coordinator position after Mike Sherman had left the Texans to take over as head coach at Texas A&M University.

On January 11, 2008, Shanahan was officially promoted, becoming the youngest coordinator in the NFL, being more than three years younger than Josh McDaniels of the New England Patriots.

Washington Redskins
In 2010, Shanahan left the Texans to join his father, Mike Shanahan,  with the Washington Redskins. The Washington Redskins’ performance during his tenure led some to question whether Shanahan's hiring was an example of unearned nepotism. In 2012, Shanahan was fined $25,000 for insulting the replacement officials and confronting one after a loss to the Cincinnati Bengals. On December 30, 2013, Kyle, along with his father and some of the coaching staff, were fired from the Washington Redskins.

Cleveland Browns
On February 1, 2014, it was reported by media outlets that Shanahan was hired as offensive coordinator for the Cleveland Browns. Prior to his hiring by the Browns, Shanahan interviewed for the vacant offensive coordinator jobs held by the Miami Dolphins and Baltimore Ravens. On January 8, 2015, Shanahan resigned from his offensive coordinator position due to friction with head coach Mike Pettine and possibly how the front office was run.

Atlanta Falcons

On January 18, 2015, the Atlanta Falcons hired Shanahan as their new offensive coordinator. After going 8–8 in 2015, the Falcons' offense under Shanahan was the highest-scoring offense in the league in 2016 and earned an 11–5 record, a division title, and a Super Bowl LI berth against the New England Patriots. Shanahan was named the NFL Assistant Coach of the Year for the 2016 season.

During Super Bowl LI, the Falcons held a 28–3 lead over the Patriots, in part thanks to Shanahan's play-calling and the Falcons' execution of those plays. However, Shanahan was criticized for being too aggressive by not using a ball-control running attack late in the game which resulted in the Falcons losing by a score of 34–28 in overtime.

San Francisco 49ers
On February 6, 2017, one day after the Super Bowl, Shanahan was officially hired as the next head coach of the San Francisco 49ers, signing a six-year deal.

2017 season

Shanahan won his first preseason game 27–17 against the Kansas City Chiefs on August 11, 2017. However, the 49ers had begun the season 0–9. On November 12, 2017, Shanahan won his first regular-season game against the New York Giants by a score of 31–21. Three weeks later, he led the 49ers to a 15–14 victory over the Chicago Bears, which marked the first start for quarterback Jimmy Garoppolo as a 49er. On December 31, 2017, the last day of the 2017 NFL regular season, Shanahan and the 49ers defeated the Los Angeles Rams 34–13, ending the season on a five-game win streak and winning six out of the last seven games.

2018 season

The 49ers managed to win only four games in 2018. The team was impacted by an early season-ending torn ACL to starting quarterback Garoppolo. Garoppolo's injury was immediately viewed as ruining the 49ers hopes for the season, despite Shanahan's optimistic outlook on Garoppolo's replacement, C. J. Beathard.

2019 season

The 49ers won their first eight games of the 2019 season, making Shanahan only the third coach, along with Tom Landry and Marvin Lewis to begin 8–0 after an earlier 0–8 season start. The 49ers finished the regular season with a 13–3 record, winning the NFC West division title and securing the #1 seed which gave the team home-field advantage throughout the playoffs.

The 49ers defeated the Minnesota Vikings 27–10 in the Divisional Round and advanced to the NFC Championship, where they beat the Green Bay Packers 37–20 and advanced to Super Bowl LIV, where they lost to the Kansas City Chiefs 31–20.

2020 season

On June 15, 2020, the 49ers signed Shanahan to a new six-year contract extension through the 2025 season. Shanahan was fined $100,000 by the NFL for not properly wearing a face mask, as required for coaches during the COVID-19 pandemic, during a Week 2 game in the 2020 NFL season on September 21, 2020. The 49ers suffered multiple injuries to key starters throughout the season and missed the playoffs, finishing the season with a 6–10 record.

2021 season

Shanahan was fined $50,000 by the NFL on July 1, 2021, for violating practice rules during organized team activities.  After starting the season 3–5, the 49ers won seven of their last nine games to finish 10–7 and enter the postseason as a wild card team. The 49ers defeated the Dallas Cowboys 23–17 in the Wild Card Round and defeated the Green Bay Packers 13–10 in the Divisional Round, before losing 20–17 in the NFC Championship to the eventual Super Bowl Champion Los Angeles Rams.

2022 season

In the 2022 season, Shanahan led the 49ers to a 13–4 regular season mark, which earned the team the NFC West title and the #2 seed in the NFC for the postseason.   The 49ers accomplished their regular season success in spite of injuries to Trey Lance and Jimmy Garappolo. The emergence of rookie Brock Purdy as the team's starting quarterback in the latter part of the season contributed to the team's success. Shanahan helped lead the 49ers to a third NFC Championship appearance in four seasons following victories over the Seattle Seahawks in the Wild Card Round and the Dallas Cowboys in the Divisional Round. In the NFC Championship against the Philadelphia Eagles, the 49ers were forced to sub Purdy for Josh Johnson due to injury. Johnson eventually went down to injury as well. Purdy was ineffective due to his injury but finished the game. The Eagles won 31–7.

Head coaching record

Personal life
Shanahan and his wife have three children.

References

External links

 Coaching record at Pro-Football-Reference.com
 San Francisco 49ers bio

1979 births
Living people
American football wide receivers
American Roman Catholics
Atlanta Falcons coaches
Cleveland Browns coaches
Houston Texans coaches
National Football League offensive coordinators
San Francisco 49ers head coaches
Sports coaches from Minneapolis
Tampa Bay Buccaneers coaches
Texas Longhorns football players
UCLA Bruins football coaches
Players of American football from Minneapolis